Lin Hung-yu (born 21 March 1986) is a Taiwanese baseball player for the Rakuten Monkeys of the Chinese Professional Baseball League (CPBL).

Career
In 2008, he was drafted by the La New Bears and assigned to their minor league team.

Lin made his pro debut on March 20 with the La New Bears, hitting 5th behind Chin-Feng Chen and catching for a team depleted by a gambling scandal over the offseason. Lin had a strong debut, going 2 for 4. He hit .303/.337/.434 as a rookie in 2010 but did not take home Rookie of the Year honors, which went instead to pitcher Ching-Ming Wang. He ranked among the CPBL leaders in average (5th, after Cheng-Min Peng, Yi-Chuan Lin, Tai-Shan Chang and Chih-Sheng Lin), doubles (tied for 6th with 22), RBI (66, 3rd behind Chih-Sheng Lin and Tai-Shan Chang) and slugging (6th behind Chih-Sheng Lin, Cheng-Min Peng, Tai-Shan Chang, Yi-Chuan Lin and Chen-Yu Chung).

In 2011, Lin was better yet at .321/.378/.544 with 22 home runs and 106 RBI for the Lamigo Monkeys (the Bears having changed their name in the offseason). He was among the leaders in average (6th behind Cheng-Wei Chang, Chih-Sheng Lin, Kuo-Ching Kao, Kuan-Jen Chen and Chen-Yu Chung), slugging (3rd behind Chih-Sheng Lin and Kuo-Ching Kao), OPS (behind Chih-Sheng Lin and Kuo-Ching Kao), OBP (8th), doubles (tied for 6th with Yen-Wen Kuo at 28), RBI (1st, 18 more than runner-up Ssu-Chi Chou), home runs (tied for the lead with Kuo-Ching Kao) and runs (78, 4th after Cheng-Wei Chang, Fu-Hao Liu and Chih-Hao Chang).

International career
He was selected Chinese Taipei national baseball team at the 2006 World University Baseball Championship, 2006 Haarlem Baseball Week, 2009 World Port Tournament, 2009 Baseball World Cup, 2013 World Baseball Classic, 2015 WBSC Premier12 and 2018 MLB Japan All-Star Series exhibition game against Japan.

In the 2009 World Port Tournament, Lin hit .296/.345/.407 as a C-DH, splitting backstop duties with Kun-Sheng Lin. He was with Taiwan for the 2009 Asian Baseball Championship.

In 2009 Baseball World Cup, serving as their cleanup hitter and DH. He hit .241/.250/.500 with a team-high four homers and 16 RBI in 15 games, showing great power but poor OBP and strikeout skills. He had game-winning hits against Australia (a 10th-inning, 2-run homer off Paul Mildren to end it) and Japan (a 10th-inning, 2-run single).

References

External links
2009 World Port Tournament

1986 births
Baseball catchers
La New Bears players
Lamigo Monkeys players
Rakuten Monkeys players
Living people
Baseball players from Tainan
2013 World Baseball Classic players
2015 WBSC Premier12 players